The Martin House is a historic house in Seekonk, Massachusetts, United States.

The house is a frame structure with clapboard exterior. It is two and a half stories, plus an 18-foot square monitor above. It has an entrance porch with two Doric columns. There are eight rooms distributed around a central hall plan.  The house was built c. 1799–1801, and is stylistically similar to houses built at the time in Newport, Rhode Island.  It was listed on the National Register of Historic Places in 1974.

Simeon Martin

Simeon Martin (October 20, 1754 – September 3, 1819) was born to an old family who had lived in Rehoboth for five generations, going back to 1665.

Martin was a captain in Christopher Lippitt's regiment in the American Revolutionary War. He fought at the Battle of Trenton with George Washington. After Newport was evacuated by the British in 1779, Martin lived in Newport.  He represented Newport in the General Assembly, and was Lieutenant Governor of Rhode Island for seven nonconsecutive one year terms, serving from 1808 to 1810 and 1811–1816. He also served as a Trustee of Brown University 1794–1819.

Martin is buried at Burial Place Hill in Rehoboth, not far from this home. His epitaph, at 405 words, is claimed to be the longest in the United States and possibly the world.

See also
National Register of Historic Places listings in Bristol County, Massachusetts

References

External links

Simeon Martin House photos at Library of Congress
Epitaph of Simeon Martin
Historic American Buildings Survey

Seekonk, Massachusetts
Houses in Bristol County, Massachusetts
Houses on the National Register of Historic Places in Bristol County, Massachusetts